Judith Ann Lowe  is the former deputy chair of the Construction Industry Training Board.

Honours 
She was appointed Officer of the Most Excellent Order of the British Empire (OBE) in the 2015 Birthday Honours for services to the construction industry, particularly women in construction.

References 

British civil engineers
Date of birth missing (living people)
Living people
Officers of the Order of the British Empire
Place of birth missing (living people)
Year of birth missing (living people)